Galactic Adventures is a 1982 video game published by Strategic Simulations for the Apple II and Atari 8-bit family.

Contents
Galactic Adventures is an adventure game using the Galactic Gladiators graphics and combat system .

Reception
David Long reviewed the game for Computer Gaming World, and stated that "SSI has done a superb job on this sequel to GG. Most role playing games have a rather abstract combat resolution sequence. GA has a complete game within a game for combat resolution, along with as complicated a series of adventures as you could want."

Norman J. Banduch reviewed Galactic Adventures in Space Gamer No. 66. Banduch commented that "Galactic Adventures is a very fine game. It has excellent graphics, a wealth of options, and the game works. The price is high, but the cost per hour becomes very low. I found that Galactic Adventures is not a game that gets old fast. It is an excellent addition to almost any adventure gamer's computer library."

References

External links
1984 Software Encyclopedia from Electronic Games
Review in Creative Computing
Review in Electronic Fun with Computers & Games
Review in ANALOG Computing
Review in Family Computing

1982 video games
Apple II games
Atari 8-bit family games
Role-playing video games
Space trading and combat simulators
Strategic Simulations games
Strategy video games
Video games developed in the United States